A motion picture content rating system classifies films based on their suitability for audiences due to their treatment of issues such as sex, violence, or substance abuse; their use of profanity; or other matters typically deemed unsuitable for children or adolescents. Most countries have some form of rating system that issues determinations variously known as certifications, classifications, certificates, or ratings. Age recommendations, of either an advisory or restrictive capacity, are often applied in lieu of censorship; in some jurisdictions movie theaters may have a legal obligation to enforce restrictive ratings.

In countries such as Australia and Singapore, an official government body decides on ratings; in other countries such as the United States, it is done by industry committees with little if any official government status. In most countries, however, films that are considered morally offensive have been censored, restricted, or banned. Even if the film rating system has no legal consequences, and a film has not explicitly been restricted or banned, there are usually laws forbidding certain films, or forbidding minors to view them. The influence of specific factors in deciding a rating varies from country to country.

Other factors may or may not influence the classification process, such as being set within a non-fictional historical context, whether the film glorifies violence or drug use, whether said violence or drug use is carried out by the protagonist, with whom the viewer should empathize, or by the antagonist. In Germany, for example, films depicting explicit war violence in a real war context (such as the Second World War) are handled more leniently than films with purely fictional settings.

A film may be produced with a particular rating in mind. It may be re-edited if the desired rating is not obtained, especially to avoid a higher rating than intended. A film may also be re-edited to produce a different version for other countries.

Comparison table
A comparison of current film rating systems, showing age on the horizontal axis. Note however that the specific criteria used in assigning a classification can vary widely from one country to another. Therefore, the color codes and age ranges are not directly comparable from one country to another.

Key:

  White  – No restrictions: Suitable for all ages / Aimed at young audiences / Exempt / Not rated / No applicable rating.
  Yellow  – No restrictions: Parental guidance is suggested for designated age range.
  Purple  – No restrictions: Not recommended for a younger audience but not restricted.
  Red  – Restricted: Parental accompaniment required for younger audiences.
  Black  – Prohibitive: Exclusively for older audience / Restricted to licensed premises / Purchase age-restricted / Banned.

Argentina

Through its Advisory Commission of Cinematographic Exhibition (Comisión Asesora de Exhibición Cinematográfica) the National Institute of Cinema and Audiovisual Arts (INCAA) issues ratings for films based on the following categories:

ATP: For all public.
+13: Suitable for 13-year-olds and over. Children under the age of 13 are admitted if accompanied by an adult.
+16: Suitable for 16-year-olds and over.
+18: Suitable for 18-year-olds and over.
C: Suitable for 18-year-olds and over. Restricted to specially licensed venues.

Australia 

The Classification Board and Classification Review Board are government-funded organisations which classify all films that are released for public exhibition.

 Advisory categories
 Check the Classification (CTC) - Message for unclassified films and computer games The film or computer game has been assessed and approved for advertising. You should check the classification closer to the release date. Advertising relating to unclassified films and games must display the CTC message - this includes posters, trailers, internet posts, and any other type of advertising. Once the content is classified, the classification marking should replace the CTC marking on all advertising material.
 General (G) – General. The content is very mild in impact. The G classification is suitable for everyone.
 Parental Guidance (PG) – Parental guidance recommended. The content is mild in impact. It is not recommended for viewing or playing by persons under 15 without guidance from parents or guardians.
 Mature (M) – Recommended for mature audiences. The content is moderate in impact. Children under 15 may legally access this material because it is an advisory category. However, M classified films and computer games may include classifiable elements such as violence and nudity of moderate impact that are not recommended for children under 15 years. 
 Restricted categories
 Mature Accompanied (MA 15+) – Not suitable for people under 15. Under 15s must be accompanied by a parent or adult guardian. The content is strong in impact.
 Restricted (R 18+) – Restricted to 18 years and over. The content is high in impact. Despite this category being legally restricted, in Queensland the restriction is not applicable to persons under 2.
 Adult film categories
 Restricted (X 18+) – Restricted to 18 years and over. This classification is a special and legally restricted category which contains only sexually explicit content. That is, material which shows actual sexual intercourse and other sexual activity between consenting adults. X 18+ films are only available for sale or hire in the Australian Capital Territory and the Northern Territory.
 Refused Classification (RC) – Refused Classification. Banned from sale or hire in the country and cannot be legally imported. Films are rated RC if their content is very high in impact and exceeds the guidelines.

Films intended to inform, educate or instruct or concerned with sport, religion or music are exempt from classification provided they do not contain material that would result in an "M" rating or higher if submitted for classification.

Austria

Motion pictures are rated by the Austrian Board of Media Classification (ABMC) for the Federal Ministry of Education, Arts and Culture (Bundesministerium für Unterricht, Kunst und Kultur). The recommendations made by the ABMC are generally not legally binding and there are nine sets of state laws on the cinema sector with different age provisions. The only exception is in the case of "16" rated films, since under Austrian law there is a legal age restriction on certain types of content i.e. discrimination, sexual abuse, glorification of violence etc. In addition to the ABMC's age recommendations, in the state of Vienna children under the age of 6 are only permitted to attend public film performances if they are accompanied.

The AMBC issues age recommendation from the following categories:
Unrestricted – Released for all age groups.
6+ – Released for children from age 6.
10+ – Released for children from age 10.
12+ – Released for children from age 12.
14+ – Released from age 14.
16+ – Released from age 16. Restricted classification.

Bahamas

The Bahamas Plays and Films Control Board classifies films in the Bahamas. Upon completion of the examination the Board will classify the film in accordance with the following ratings:

 A - Suitable for all ages.
 B - Suitable for adults; persons under the age of 18 must be accompanied by a parent or responsible adult.
 T - Suitable for persons 15 and over, persons under 15 years are not admitted whether accompanied by an adult or not.
 C - Suitable for adults only, persons under 18 years are not admitted whether accompanied by an adult or not.
 D - Unsuitable for public viewing.

Barbados
In Barbados, films are classified by the Film Censorship Board (FCB):

 GA – General Audience; Suitable for all ages.
 PG –  Parental Guidance.
 PG13 – Parental Guidance 13; suitable for 13 years and older.
 R – Suitable for 18 years and older.
 A – Adult Only; No-one under 18 admitted.

Belgium

On 8 January 2020, Belgium adopted the Dutch Kijkwijzer classification system. Belgium had previously used a basic two-tier system, in place since 1 September 1920. Until January 2020, classifications for films publicly exhibited in Belgium were issued by the Inter-Community Commission for Film Rating. Films were prohibited to minors under the age of 16 unless passed by the commission. There is no mandatory rating system for video formats but 90% of video distribution abides by the voluntary Belgium Video Federation. It was basically the same as the system for theatrical exhibition, but also provided a "12" rating. Under Kijkwijzer, the distributor fills out a questionnaire about the content of the film and an age category is automatically assigned. The new system is fully advisory, and carries no mandatory restrictions. In the French and German-speaking communities, the system is known as Cinecheck.

The age categories are as follows:

 AL/TOUS: All ages.
 6: From 6 years.
 9:  From 9 years.
 12:  From 12 years.
 14:  From 14 years.
 16: From 16 years.
 18: From 18 years.

Brazil

All films that are exhibited in public or released on a home video format in Brazil must be submitted for classification to the advisory rating (Classificação Indicativa, abbreviated ClassInd), which is run by the Brazilian Ministry of Justice (Ministério da Justiça). Under 10 must always be accompanied by an adult guard. Anyone below the film's minimum age can watch it if accompanied or allowed by the parent or guardian who is at least 18 years old, except for those rated 18, which can only be allowed for teenagers aged 16. Unlike many countries, the ClassInd does not have any legal right to ban, demand cuts or refuse to rate any film.

The ClassInd uses the following system:
 ER: Especialmente recomendado para crianças (Especially recommended for children)
 L: Livre (General)
 10: Não recomendado para menores de 10 anos (Not recommended for minors under 10)
 12: Não recomendado para menores de 12 anos (Not recommended for minors under 12)
 14: Não recomendado para menores de 14 anos (Not recommended for minors under 14)
 16: Não recomendado para menores de 16 anos (Not recommended for minors under 16)
 18: Não recomendado para menores de 18 anos (Not recommended for minors under 18)

There are also operational descriptions of attenuating and aggravating elements that can interfere on the final rating.

Bulgaria

The Bulgarian film rating system is defined in the Film Industry Act of 2003 and administered by the National Film Rating Committee.

 A – Recommended for children.
 B – No age restrictions. 
 C – Not recommended for children under 12. No persons under 12 shall be admitted unless accompanied by an adult.
 D – Prohibited for persons under 16.
 X – Prohibited for persons under 18, for licensed venues only.

Canada

Film ratings in Canada are a provincial responsibility, and each province has its own legislation, rules and regulations regarding rating, exhibition and admission. Ratings are required for theatrical exhibition, but not all provinces require classification for home video. In the past there was a wide range of rating categories and practices in the various provinces; however, the seven rating systems—with the exception of Quebec—now all use categories and logos derived from the Canadian Home Video Rating System (CHVRS).

Classifications used outside Quebec

The categories are mostly identical to the CHVRS with a few minor variations. In the provinces that require classification of video formats, supply of 14A and 18A films is restricted to customers above those ages. In the case of theatre exhibition, children are admitted to 14A if accompanied by an adult. In British Columbia, Saskatchewan (administered by the British Columbia Film Classification Office), Alberta and Ontario children are also admitted to 18A films if accompanied. Children over the age of 14 are admitted to 18A films in the Manitoba and Maritime provinces if accompanied by an adult. The Maritimes and British Columbia (along with Saskatchewan) also provide an "A" classification for adult content. Some provinces, such as Nova Scotia, reserve the right to prohibit films altogether.

In general, the categories are:
 G – Suitable for viewing by all ages.
 PG – Parental guidance advised.
Not Recommended For Young Children – The film may be inappropriate for young children. “Young Children” would be persons age 8 and under.
14A – Suitable for people 14 years of age or older. Those under 14 should view with an adult. No rental or purchase by those under 14. Parents cautioned. (Formerly "Adult Accompaniment (14)" in the Maritimes)
Not Recommended For Children – “Children” would be persons age 13 and under. Films with this advisory may include scenes that reflect a more mature situation, such as drug use or abuse.
 18A – Suitable for people 18 years of age or older. Those under 18 should view with an adult. Additionally, in certain provinces there is a mandatory age restriction of 14 years. No rental or purchase by those under 18. Parents strongly cautioned.
 R – Restricted to 18 years and over. No rental or purchase by those under 18. Content not suitable for minors.
 A  – Adult. Film is not suitable for viewers under 18 years of age. (Formerly "Explicit Material (XXX)" in the Maritimes)
 E – Exempt.

Classifications used in Quebec

In Quebec, the provincial Ministry of Culture and Communications (and until 2017 the Régie du cinéma) rates all films and videos; its purview devolves from the Cinema Act (chapter C-18.1). In some cases the Ministry may refuse to provide a classification, effectively banning the film. Educational and sports films are exempt from classification.

 G: Visa général (General Rating) – May be viewed, rented or purchased by persons of all ages. If a film carrying a "G" rating might offend the sensibilities of a child under 8 years of age, "Not suitable for young children" is appended to the classification.
 13+: 13 ans et plus (13 years and over) – May be viewed, rented or purchased only by persons 13 years of age or over. Children under 13 may be admitted only if accompanied by an adult.
 16+: 16 ans et plus (16 years and over) – May be viewed, rented or purchased only by persons 16 years of age or over.
 18+: 18 ans et plus (18 years and over) – May be viewed, rented or purchased only by persons 18 years of age or over. If a film contains real and explicit sexual activity "Explicit sexuality" is appended to the classification, and in the retail video industry storeowners are required to place the film in a room reserved for adults.

Chile

Films are classified by the Council of Cinematographic Classification (Consejo de Calificación Cinematográfica) which is a central agency under the Ministry of Education. In 2002 legislation was enacted which reversed the ban on all 1,090 films that had previously been banned in Chile.

The current age ratings (enacted in 1993) are:

TE (Todo Espectador) – General audience.
TE+7 (Inconveniente para menores de 7 años) – Not suitable for children younger than 7 years.
Mayores de 14 años – 14 years old and over.
Mayores de 18 años – 18 years old and over.

The age ratings may also be supplemented by the following content categories:

Contenido educativo – Educational content.
Contenido pornográfico – Pornographic content.
Contenido excesivamente violento – Excessively violent content.

Pornographic films may only be exhibited at venues licensed for that purpose. Minors are not admitted to films with pornographic or excessively violent content.

China

China does not have a rating system. Only films that are passed as "suitable for all ages" are released although some exhibitors have introduced informal ratings. A March 2017 effective law on film does require non-violations of the lawful rights and interests of minors (Chinese: 未成年人) or harming the physical and psychological health of minors. However, in an interview with China Central Television in the same month, the State Administration of Press, Publication, Radio, Film and Television's film chief Mr. Zhang Hongsen said it was inaccurate for the media to label the guideline for minors as manual/euphemistic classification and it was a misinterpretation or over-interpretation of the new law.

Colombia

As of 22 June 2005, the Ministry of Culture issued its new rating system. The classifications are:

 T: For general audiences.
 7: Advisory.
 12: Advisory.
 15: Restricted.
 18: Restricted.
 X: Pornographic content.
 Prohibited: Contains elements that incite or advocate crime.

Cook Islands
In the Cook Islands, publications such as films, TV shows and video games are classified by the Cook Islands Censorship Office in accordance with the Film and Censorship Act 1985. The following four classifications are used:
 G (general)
 PG (parental guidance) 
 MA (mature audiences)
 R18 (restricted to adults)

The Censorship Office does not define the age for a "mature audience", but its television code—which uses the same ratings—defines a child as "15 years and under".

Denmark

In Denmark, the Media Council for Children and Young People currently rates films. Films do not have to be submitted for a rating and in such instances must be labelled a "15" (restricted to people aged 15 and above). Children aged 7 and above may attend any performance—including those restricted to older audiences—if they are accompanied by an adult.

 A – Suitable for a general audience.
 7 – Not recommended for children under 7.
 11 – For ages 11 and up.
 15 – For ages 15 and up.
 F – Exempt from classification.

Estonia

Film classification in Estonia is regulated by the Child Welfare Act.

 PERE – Family Film.
 L – Allowed to all.
 MS-6 – Not recommended for under 6.
 MS-12 – Not recommended for under 12.
 K-12 – Prohibited for under 12 unless accompanied by an adult.
 K-14 – Prohibited for under 14 unless accompanied by an adult.
 K-16 – Prohibited for under 16 unless accompanied by an adult.

Fiji
In Fiji, films are classified by the Fijian Censors Board:
 G - approved for general exhibition
 Y - approved for exhibition to viewers of the age of 13 and over
 A - approved for exhibition to adults only (18 and over)
 R - approved for restricted public exhibition subject to conditions imposed by the censor

Finland

Films in Finland are classified by the National Audiovisual Institute. A minor up to 3 years younger than the age limit is permitted to see a film in a cinema when accompanied by an adult, except for 18-rated films. Films with an age rating may contain an additional marker for violence, sex, fear, or substance abuse. The ratings are as follows:

 S (Finnish) or T (Swedish) – For all ages.
 7 – For 7 years and over.
 12 – For 12 years and over.
 16 – For 16 years and over.
 18 – Prohibited for children under 18 years of age.

France

Prior to showing in theatres, a distribution certificate must be obtained from the Ministry of Culture. The Minister will decide which certificate to issue based on a recommendation by the classification of the Centre national du cinéma et de l'image animée (CNC). In some cases, films may be classified as "pornographic films or those containing an incitement to violence" or completely prohibited from screening. A certificate will be granted from the following:

TP (Tous publics) – Certificate authorising the screening of the film to all members of the public.
-12 – Certificate prohibiting the screening of the film to minors under 12.
-16 – Certificate prohibiting the screening of the film to minors under 16.
-18 – Certificate prohibiting the screening of the film to minors under 18.
Interdiction (prohibition) – Certificate totally prohibiting the screening of the film.

Germany

The Freiwillige Selbstkontrolle der Filmwirtschaft (Voluntary Self-Regulation of the Film Industry, FSK) has a film ratings system under which films are classified. All the ratings contain the phrase "gemäß §14 JuSchG" (in accordance with §14 of the Youth Protection Law), signifying that they are legally binding for minors. Cinemas may legally exhibit films without a classification but minors are prohibited from such screenings.

 Ohne Altersbeschränkung (FSK 0): no age restriction (white sign).
 Freigegeben ab 6 Jahren (FSK 6): released to ages 6 and older, nobody under this age admitted (yellow sign).
 Freigegeben ab 12 Jahren (FSK 12): released to ages 12 and older; children who are at least age 6 may be admitted with adult accompaniment (green sign).
 Freigegeben ab 16 Jahren (FSK 16): released to ages 16 and older, nobody under this age admitted (blue sign).
 Keine Jugendfreigabe (FSK 18): "no youth admitted", adults only. (red sign).
 Infoprogramm or Lehrprogramm: "educational programming". This rating is not issued by the FSK, but may be self-applied to films seeking to educate their audience (e.g. documentaries, instructional films, etc.). Films with this rating may be sold without any age restriction provided they do not contain any material "evidently harmful to the development of children and youths".

The FSK rating also limits the time of the day in which the movie may be aired on free-to-air TV stations to a time frame between 22:00 (FSK 16) or 23:00 (FSK 18) and 6:00. Stations are permitted to broadcast films not approved for audiences under 12 at their own discretion.

Greece

All publicly released films must be submitted to the Youth Committee for classification. There are four categories:

 Unrestricted – No restrictions (The film does not contain violence, drug abuse, or sexual content).
 13 – The film may contain mild violence and adult themes. Suitable for people aged 13 and above.
 17 – The film may contain violence, drug abuse, and softcore pornographic scenes. An ID card certifying the age is required in all Greek cinemas and video rental shops in order to get a cinema ticket or rent a video of a "17" rated film. Not permitted to young people under the age of 17.
 18 – Not permitted to people under the age of 18.

Hong Kong

Films intended for public exhibition have to be submitted to the Director of Film, Newspaper and Article Administration, who is the Film Censorship Authority (FCA) under the Ordinance, for approval. Films approved for public exhibition are then either classified or exempted from classification.

I – Suitable for all ages. (circle sign).
II – Not suitable for children. (square sign).
II – Not suitable for young persons and children.
III – Persons aged 18 or above only. (triangle sign).

Of the four levels, Categories I, II, and II are unrestricted. Only Category III is a restricted category and regulated by the government.

Hungary 

Hungarian ratings are decided by the National Media and Infocommunications Authority (NMHH):

 KN (korhatár nélkül) – All audiences.
 6 – Not recommended below age of 6.
 12 – Not recommended below age of 12.
 16 – Not recommended below age of 16.
 18 – Not recommended below age of 18.
 X – Restricted below 18, for adults only. Excessively violent scenes.

All ratings are advisory except the "X" classification. The current one is the third motion picture rating system in Hungary. The first system existed between 1965 and 2004, and was administered by the Ministry for National Cultural Heritage and its predecessors. Its categories were "Without age restriction", "Not recommended below age of 14", "Above age of 16 only", and "Above age of 18 only". A second system was introduced in 2004 which was overhauled in 2011 in favour of the current system. Its categories—given by the National Film Office—were "Without age restriction", "Parental guidance suggested below age of 12", "Not recommended below age of 16", "Not recommended below age of 18", and "For adults only".

Iceland
Since 1 July 2006, FRÍSK (short for Félag rétthafa í sjónvarps- og kvikmyndaiðnaði) has replaced the Kvikmyndaskoðun system in Iceland. In October 2013, FRÍSK announced that it was adopting a new system similar to the Netherlands' Kijkwijzer at least through 2016. The Icelandic ratings system also provides an "18" rating in addition to the Kijkwijzer ratings. Under Icelandic law, minors aged 14-years-old and over may be admitted to a film carrying a higher age rating if accompanied by an adult. The ratings are as follows:

 L: All ages.
 6: Not suitable for children under 6 years.
 9: Not suitable for children under 9 years.
 12: Not suitable for children under 12 years.
 14: Not suitable for children under 14 years.
 16: Not suitable for children under 16 years.
 18: Not suitable for children under 18 years.

India

In India, Central Board of Film Certification (CBFC) is responsible for certifying films meant for public exhibition.

 U – Unrestricted public exhibition.
 U/A – Unrestricted public exhibition, but with parental guidance for children below the age of 12 years.
 A – Restricted to adults.
 S – Restricted to any special class of persons.

Indonesia

Motion pictures shown in Indonesia must undergo reviewing by the Film Censorship Agency of the Republic of Indonesia (LSF). Other than issuing certificates, the LSF also reviews and issues permits for film-related advertising, such as movie trailers and posters. LSF has the authority to cut scenes from films.  Films passed for exhibition are awarded one of the following classifications:
SU (Semua Umur): All ages.
13+: Suitable for ages 13 and above.
17+: Suitable for ages 17 and above.
21+: Suitable for ages 21 and above.

Iraq

The Iraqi film rating system is declared by the Ministry of Information and Culture. It is against the law for an underage person to enter restricted films at the cinemas, even with their parents, where a proof of identity may be required.

 G: General Exhibition - open for all ages.
 PG 13: Customer may be aged 13 years and under, but must be accompanied by someone 13 years old or older. Please note content may not be appropriate for 13 years and below, booking to be at the discretion of guardians and parents.
 PG 15: Customer may be aged 15 years and under, but must be accompanied by someone 15 years old or older. Please note content may not be appropriate for 15 years and below, booking to be at the discretion of guardians and parents.
 15+: No persons under 15 years of age will be admitted. Babies not allowed.
 18+: No persons under 18 years of age will be admitted. Babies not allowed.
 18TC: Rated 18+ until confirmed by the National Media Council. Entry to the cinema must comply with the age restriction of final confirmed rating. Booking prior to confirmed rating, is at customers discretion.

Ireland

All films that are exhibited in public or released on a home video format must be submitted for classification to the Irish Film Classification Office (IFCO).

G (General) – Suitable for children of school going age (note: children can be enrolled in school from the age of 4).
PG (Parental Guidance) – Suitable for children over the age of 8. Parental guidance is recommended for children under the age of 12.
12A, 12 – Suitable for viewers of 12 and over. Younger children may be admitted to the film at cinemas if accompanied by an adult; on home video younger viewers are not permitted to purchase/rent the video.
15A, 15 –  Suitable for viewers of 15 and over. Younger viewers may be admitted to the film at cinemas if accompanied by an adult; on home video younger viewers are not permitted to purchase/rent the video.
16 (cinema only) – Suitable for viewers of 16 and over. Younger viewers are not admitted.
18 –  Suitable only for adults. Viewers under 18 are not admitted at cinemas or permitted to purchase/rent the video.

Italy

In Italy the rating system of the films is currently disciplined by the Decreto legislativo n° 203 of 7 December 2017. For commercial release, distributors are requested to classify their films based on the age of the audience. Their decision is verified by a commission of the Ministry of Culture, composed of members of the film industry and experts in education and animal rights. Since 2021 the commission is no longer allowed to ban a film or demand edits. Films are classified into one of the following categories:

T: no age restriction.
6+: not suitable for children under 6.
14+: released to ages 14 and older; children who are at least 12 may be admitted with adult accompaniment.
18+: released to ages 18 and older; children who are at least 16 may be admitted with adult accompaniment.

The classification only applies to commercial releases in theaters, and the law does not require classification of home media. Before 2021, films aimed to be shown in theatres were classified for all ages (T) or prohibited for children under 14 or 18 by the Commission for Film Review. The Commission could also ask for some scenes to be cut or ban the distribution of the film.

Jamaica

Film classification in Jamaica is a requirement of the Cinematograph Act of 1913, which also established the Cinematograph Authority.

G (General Audiences): Appropriate for all ages.
PG (only applied occasionally).
PG-13: Children 12 years and under must be accompanied by parent/guardian.
T-16: Teenagers 14 & 15 will be admitted in the company of an adult.
A-18: No one under the age of 18 years will be admitted.

Japan

A Japanese film rating regulator known as  [full-name: ] has a film classification system under which films are classified into one of four categories. The categories have been in use since 1 May 1998.

G: General, suitable for all ages.
PG12: Parental guidance requested for young people under 12 years.
R15+: No one under 15 admitted.
R18+: No one under 18 admitted.

Kazakhstan

In Kazakhstan, films are rated by the Committee for Culture of the Ministry for Culture and Information.

 6-: 6 жасқа толмаған балаларға арналған фильмдер. Films intended for children under the age of 6.
 6+: 6 жасқа толған балаларға арналған фильмдер. Films intended for children over the age of 6.
 12+: 12 жасқа толған балаларға арналған фильмдер. Films intended for children over the age of 12.
 14+: 14 жасқа толған балаларға арналған фильмдер. Films intended for children over the age of 14.
 16+: 16 жасқа толған адамдарға арналған фильмдер. Films intended for viewers over the age of 16.
 18+: 18 жасқа толған адамдарға арналған фильмдер. Films intended for viewers over the age of 18.
 21+: 21 жасқа толған адамдарға арналған фильмдер. Films intended for viewers over the age of 21. Restricted to licensed venues between 10pm and 6am local time.

Kenya

In Kenya, films are rated by the Kenya Film Classification Board.

GE (General Exhibition) – Suitable for all ages.
PG (Parental Guidance Recommended) – May contain scenes unsuitable for children under the age of 10. While the content may be suitable for children, parents are advised to monitor the content.
16 (Unsuitable for persons under age of 16) – Restricted to persons aged 16 years and above.
18 (Adults Only) – Restricted to persons aged 18 years and above.
Restricted/Banned

Kuwait

In Kuwait, films are rated by the Censor Board Committee (لجنة الرقابة) under authority of the Ministry of Information (وزارة الإعلام). The Committee may sanction edits of or outright ban certain films in order to comply with cultural laws and values of Kuwait. The Ministry of Information originally established an age classifications system for films under decision number #73, article #10 of year 2012. The 2012 system rated films as either for "general audiences" (G) or for "persons aged 16 and above" (16+). Circa 2015, two additional classifications were introduced for films rated as "under 13 need to be accompanied with adults" (PG) or "adults only" (18+). However, by May 2016, the Ministry of Information established a new age classifications system for films under decision number #30 of year 2016. Therefore, as of May 2016, films in Kuwait are rated under the following:

E – Film content is suitable for everyone.
PG – Under 13 requires accompanying parent or adult guardian.
T (13+) – Under 13s are not permitted.
18+ – Under 18s are not permitted.

Cinemas are legally obligated to refuse entry to any minor under the required age of any film's established age classification.

Latvia

In Latvia it is the duty of the producer of a film or distributor to assign a rating according to a pre-determined set of criteria. All publicly exhibited films, visual recordings and films broadcast over television and electronic networks must be classified.

U (universal audience) – Suitable for persons of all age groups.
7+: Suitable for a person who has reached at least 7 years of age.
12+: Suitable for a person who has reached at least 12 years of age.
16+: Suitable for a person who has reached at least 16 years of age.
18+: Not suitable for a minor (prohibited to people under 18).

Lebanon

Films released in Lebanon are rated by the Lebanese Censorship Board. 
 G: Intended for General Audiences. All ages are admitted. 
 PG: Parental Guidance is suggested. 
 PG13: Children under 13 years of age will not be admitted. 
 PG16: Persons under 16 years of age will not be admitted. 
 18+: Persons under 18 years of age will not be admitted.

Lithuania

The Lithuanian Film Centre is a state institution under the Ministry of Culture of Lithuania. A film approved for public exhibition receives one of the ratings below based on its content:

V: Released for all ages. The full name for the classification is visi, which means "all"
N-7: Released from age 7 and above. Children aged under 7 may be admitted with adult supervision.
N-13: Released from age 13 and above. Children aged between 7 and 12 may be admitted with adult supervision.
N-16: Released from age 16 and above. No one under 16 is admitted.
N-18: Released from age 18 and above. No one under 18 is admitted.

Malaysia

Historically, film censorship in Malaysia was carried out by police under the Theatre Ordinance 1908. In 1954 the Film Censorship Board (LPF) was created to censor films distributed across Malaysia in accordance with the Cinematograph Films Act 1952, and later the Film Censorship Act 2002. Malaysia's motion picture rating system was introduced in 1953, initially classifying films either for General Audiences (Tontonan Umum) or For Adults Only (Untuk Orang Dewasa Sahaja), and in 1996 these classifications were changed to "U" and four different "18" categories (which were amalgamated back into a single classification in 2010). In 2008, the "PG13" classification was introduced, which admitted children under the age of 13 if accompanied by an adult ("PG13" underwent a cosmetic change to "P13" in 2012). In February 2023, the "P13" classification was split in two—a "P12" classification (effectively the same as "P13" but with a slightly lower age threshold) and a prohibitive "13" classification, which bars admission to children under the age of 13. A prohibitive "16" classification was also introduced, barring audiences under the age of 16.

Upon viewing the board will assign one of three categories to the film:

 Lulus Bersih (Passed Clean [i.e. without cuts])
 Lulus Dengan Pengubahan (Passed with Edits/Cuts)
 Tidak Diluluskan Untuk Tayangan (Not Approved for Screening)

Should a film be approved, the Board then assigns the film a classification. As of 2023 the ratings are:

U (Umum) - Suitable for all ages.
P12 (Penjaga) – Parental guidance required for audiences under the age of 12.
13 – For audiences aged 13 years old and above.
16 – For audiences aged 16 years old and above.
18 – For audiences aged 18 years old and above.

Maldives

Film in the Maldives are classified by the National Bureau of Classification. Certificates issued are based on the following categories:

 G – Suitable for all ages.
 PG – Parental guidance.
12+ – For ages 12 and above.
15+ – Suitable for ages 15 and above.
18+ – Suitable for ages 18 and above.
18+R – Suitable for ages 18 and above. Restricted.
PU – For professional use only.

Malta

As of 2012, films in Malta are classified by the Film Board in accordance with the Malta Council for Culture and the Arts Act. As part of an overhaul in 2013 the "14" and "16" age classifications were replaced by "12A" and "15"; the "PG" rating was redefined while "U", "12" and "18" were retained in their existing form.

If the film is deemed "fit for exhibition" it will be awarded one of the following classifications:

U (Universal) – Suitable for all.
PG (Parental Guidance) – General viewing, but some scenes may be unsuitable for young children.
12A – Suitable for persons of 12 years and over: Provided that persons younger than 12 years may attend only when accompanied by an adult.
12 – Suitable only for persons of 12 years and over.
15 – Suitable only for persons of 15 years and over.
18 – Suitable only for persons of 18 years and over.

Mauritius
The Film Classification Board (FCB) classifies films and stage plays on behalf of the Ministry of Arts and Cultural Heritage. Film will be awarded one of the following classifications in accordance with the Film Act 2002 or rejected.

 U (Universal) – Suitable for all audiences.
 PG – Parental Guidance is compulsory for children under the age of 12.
 15 – Suitable for persons of the age of 15 and above.
 18 – Suitable for all Adults.
 18R – Adult audiences only (subject to specified conditions)
 Rejected – Not allowed.

Mexico

The General Directorate of Radio, Television and Cinematography (in Spanish, Dirección General de Radio, Televisión y Cinematografía) is the issuer of ratings for motion pictures. The RTC is an agency of the Secretariat of the Interior (Secretaría de Gobernación). It has its own classification system, as follows:

AA Informative-only rating: Understandable for children under 7 years.
A Information-only rating: For all age groups.
B Information-only rating: For adolescents 12 years and older.
B-15 Information-only rating: Not recommended for children under 15.
C Restrictive rating: For adults 18 and older.
D Restrictive rating: Adult movies (legally prohibited to those under 18 years of age).

Netherlands

In the Netherlands, the Kijkwijzer system is used, which is executed by the Netherlands Institute for the Classification of Audiovisual Media (NICAM). Under Dutch law children are admitted to films carrying an age rating if accompanied by an adult except in the case of "16" and "18" rated films.

 AL: All ages.
 6: Potentially harmful to children under 6 years.
 9:  Potentially harmful to children under 9 years.
 12:  Potentially harmful to children under 12 years.
 14:  Potentially harmful to children under 14 years.
 16: Potentially harmful to and not allowed for children under 16 years.
 18: Potentially harmful to and not allowed for children under 18 years.

There are also six descriptor icons used:
  Violence (Geweld)
  Fear (Angst)
  Sexual Content (Seks)
  Discrimination (Discriminatie)
  Drug and/or Alcohol abuse (Drugs- en/of alcoholmisbruik)
  Bad Language (Grof taalgebruik)

Mostly, these icons are used along with other symbols, displaying if a film contains violence, sexual content, frightening scenes, drug or alcohol abuse, discrimination, or coarse language. These symbols are also used in television channels broadcasting under license issued in the Netherlands (independent from country for which the channel are dedicated).

New Zealand

The Films, Videos, and Publications Classification Act 1993 gives the Office of Film and Literature Classification the power to classify publications into three categories: unrestricted, restricted, or "objectionable" (banned). With a few exceptions, films, videos, DVDs and restricted computer games must carry a label before being offered for supply or exhibited to the public.

In 2017 the Office of Film and Literature Classification created a special RP18 rating for online content in response to the Netflix television series, 13 Reasons Why. The new classification reflects concerns raised with 17 and 18 year olds in New Zealand being at a higher risk of suicide. The current ratings are:

 G: Anyone can be shown or sold this.
 PG: Films and games with a PG label can be sold, hired, or shown to anyone. The PG label means guidance from a parent or guardian is recommended for younger viewers.
 M: Films and games with an M label can be sold, hired, or shown to anyone. Films with an M label are more suitable for mature audiences 16 years and over.
 RP13: Restricted to persons 13 years and over unless accompanied by a Parent/Guardian.
 RP16: Restricted to persons 16 years and over unless accompanied by a Parent/Guardian.
 RP18: Restricted to persons 18 years and over unless accompanied by a Parent/Guardian (online content only).
 R13: Restricted to persons 13 years and over.
 R15: Restricted to persons 15 years and over.
 R16: Restricted to persons 16 years and over.
 R18: Restricted to persons 18 years and over.
 R: Restricted exclusively to a certain audience.

In order for a film or video game to be released in New Zealand, they must:
 Be classified by either the Australian Classification Board in Australia or the BBFC in the United Kingdom before being given with a New Zealand classification rating for public release. If they are being given a classification rating of unrestricted G, PG or M in Australia or the equivalent one in the United Kingdom, it will be cross-rated. However this may not be easy as it seems. New Zealand's treatment of violence is stricter than that of Australia compared to offensive language and sex. 

 For Video Games that have been classified as unrestricted G, PG or M from Australia are exempt from being classified in New Zealand. If they have a restricted classification from Australia or the United Kingdom, they'll need to be classified with a New Zealand classification rating before releasing it to the public.

Nigeria

The National Film and Video Censors Board classifies films, videos, DVDs, and VCDs. Classifications carrying an age rating are legally restricted, although the "15" and "18" classifications do not apply to people below 2 years of age.  The categories are:
 G: Suitable for viewing by persons of all ages.
 PG: Parental Guidance is advised. 
 12: Not permitted for people under the age of 12.  
 12A: Not permitted for people under the age of 12. A child must be accompanied by an adult to view the film.  
 15: Not permitted for persons under the age of 15.
 18: Not permitted for people under the age of 18. 
 RE: Films which fall under this category are to be exhibited and distributed only in specially licensed premises.

Norway

	
In Norway, all films—whether they are exhibited in cinemas, distributed on video, shown on television or streamed through on-demand services—are required by law to be classified. Films shown in cinemas must be classified by the distributor, and films made available by other means must be classified by whoever who has the rights to make them available in Norway. Classifications are mandated to follow the guidelines and age limits set by the Norwegian Media Authority (Medietilsynet). The law previously required films to be classified by the Norwegian Media Authority, but this was repealed in 2022.

The following age limits apply to films:

 A – Suitable for all.
 6 – 6 years (no restriction for children accompanied by an adult).
 9 – 9 years (children down to 6 years accompanied by an adult).
 12 – 12 years (children down to 9 years accompanied by an adult).
 15 – 15 years (children down to 12 years accompanied by an adult).
 18 – 18 years (no one under this age admitted).

Philippines

In the Philippines, motion pictures, along with television programs, are rated by the Movie and Television Review and Classification Board, a special agency of the Office of the President. As of 2012, the Board uses six classification ratings.

G (General Audiences) – Viewers of all ages are admitted.
PG (Parental Guidance) – Viewers below 13 years old must be accompanied by a parent or supervising adult.
R-13 (Restricted-13) – Only viewers who are 13 years old and above can be admitted.
R-16 (Restricted-16) – Only viewers who are 16 years old and above can be admitted.
R-18 (Restricted-18) – Only viewers who are 18 years old and above can be admitted.
X (Not For Public Exhibition) – "X-rated" films are not suitable for public exhibition.

Independent, foreign-language and art-house films released in the Philippines are not rated by the MTRCB themselves but are instead rated through the Film Development Council of the Philippines. Nevertheless, the same rating system applies.

Poland
Ratings in Poland are not set by any board or advisory body. Prior to 1989 the applicable age ratings were "no age limit", "over 7", "over 12", "over 15" and "over 18" and were set by The General Committee of Cinematography. Since 1989 there is no official classification system, with age ratings being self-prescriptive and set by the distributors. In case of television, the supervisory body – Krajowa Rada Radiofonii i Telewizji (KRRiT, The National Council of Radio Broadcasting and Television) can impose fines upon those responsible for improper rating of a broadcast, or lack of it.

Portugal

Movies are rated in Portugal by the Comissão de Classificação de Espectáculos of the Ministry of Culture. In cinemas the ratings are mandatory (subject to parental guidance) whereas for video releases they are merely advisory, except in the case of pornographic content. Children under the age of 3 were previously prohibited from public film performances, but a special category was introduced for this age group when the classification system was overhauled in 2014. A category for 14-year-olds was also introduced, and the lowest age rating was dropped from 4 years of age to 3. The categories are the following:

 Para todos os públicos – For all the public (especially designed for children under 3 years of age).
 M/3 Passed for viewers aged 3 and older.
 M/6 Passed for viewers aged 6 and older.
 M/12 Passed for viewers aged 12 and older.
 M/14 Passed for viewers aged 14 and older.
 M/16 Passed for viewers aged 16 and older.
 M/18 Passed for viewers aged 18 and older.
 P Special rating supplementary to the M/18 age rating denoting "pornography".

Romania
Ratings in Romania are set by the National Center of Cinematography (CNC).

AG – General audience.
AP-12 – Parental guidance for children under 12.
N-15 – Not recommended for children under 15.
IM-18 – Prohibited to minors under 18.
IM-18-XXX – Prohibited to minors under 18 and projection in public.
IC – Prohibition of communication.

Russia

Since 2012, the rating appears inside circles, which indicate age restrictions followed by a plus(+), and appears in most shows, including TV and Internet shows in Russia.

The indication shown:
 0+ – All ages are admitted.
 6+ для детей старше 6 лет  (For children over 6 years) – Unsuitable for children under 6.
 12+ для детей старше 12 лет  (For children over 12 years) – Unsuitable for children under 12.
 16+ для детей старше 16 лет  (For children over 16 years) – Unsuitable for children under 16.
 18+ запрещено для детей (Prohibited for children) – Prohibited for children under 18.
 Фильмы, которым отказано в классификации (Refused classification) – Banned.

Saudi Arabia

Film classification in Saudi Arabia is administered by the General Commission for Audiovisual Media (GCAM), after the reintroduction of film theatres in the country, as of 2017. GCAM officially approved a system in 2018, and revised it in 2022 to incorporate a "PG15" rating. The classifications are: 

G: General – For the general public.
PG: Parental Guidance – Adult supervision recommended for children under the age of 12.
PG12: Parental Guidance 12 – Adult supervision required for children under the age of 12.
PG15: Parental Guidance 15 – Adult supervision required for children under the age of 15.
R12: Audiences under the age of 12 are prohibited.
R15: Audiences under the age of 15 are prohibited.
R18: Audiences under the age of 18 are prohibited.

Singapore

Film classification in Singapore was introduced on 1 July 1991 and comes under the jurisdiction of the Board of Film Censors (BFC), currently part of the Infocomm Media Development Authority (IMDA). There were three ratings originally: G (General), PG (Parental Guidance) and R (Restricted to 18 years and above). Prior to then films were either approved or effectively banned. Since then, there have been several alterations to the ratings over the years. In September 1991, a Restricted (Artistic) (R(A)) rating was introduced to replace the previous R-rating so as to allow the screening of certain art-house films which would otherwise have been banned without said rating, with an increased age restriction set at 21 years of age. The R(A) rating has since been replaced by NC16 (No Children under 16), M18 (Mature 18) and R21 (Restricted 21). A PG13 (Parental Guidance 13) rating, introduced in 2011, is the latest rating to be introduced. The G, PG and PG13 ratings are advisory while NC16, M18 and R21 carry age restrictions. Video ratings are mostly the same as the cinema ratings, except only go up to M18. Some titles, such as documentaries, children's programmes and sports programmes may be exempt from classification on video, but all titles must be classified for public theatrical exhibition. 

The categories are:
G: General – Suitable for all ages.
PG: Parental Guidance – Suitable for all but parents should guide their young.
PG13: Parental Guidance 13 – Suitable for persons aged 13 and above but parental guidance is advised for children below 13.
NC16: No Children Under 16 – Suitable for persons aged 16 and above.
M18: Mature 18 – Suitable for persons aged 18 and above.
R21: Restricted 21 – Suitable for adults aged 21 and above (restricted to licensed cinemas).
In exceptional cases, a film may be refused classification if it either exceeds the permissible limits of the R21 classification, contains any material that undermines or is likely to undermine public order, or is likely to be prejudicial to national interest.

Slovakia
Jednotný systém označovania (English: Unified System of Age Rating/Labeling) (JSO) is a statutory board of Ministry of Culture of Slovakia under act 589/2007, which regulates age restriction of films, television programs and video games in Slovakia. 

The age ratings are:
"Teddy bear's head" – Content suitable for children younger than 12 years.
U – General audience
7 – Not recommended for children younger than 7 years.
12 – Not recommended for people younger than 12 years.
15 – Not recommended for people younger than 15 years.
18 – Prohibited for minors under 18 years of age.

In addition, educational movie ratings are:
-7 – Targeted at children younger than 7 years.
7+ – Appropriate for children older than 7 years.
12+ – Appropriate for people 12 years and over.
15+ – Appropriate for people 15 years and over.

South Africa

In South Africa, films are classified by the Film and Publication Board. Distributors and exhibitors are legally compelled to comply with the age ratings.  All broadcasters, cinemas and distributors of DVD/video and computer games must comply with the following:

 A: Suitable for all.
 PG: Parental Guidance
 7–9PG: Not suitable for children under the age of 7. Children aged 7–9 years old may not be admitted unless accompanied by an adult.
 10–12PG: Not suitable for children under the age of 10. Children aged 10–12 years old may not be admitted unless accompanied by an adult.
 13: Not suitable for children under the age of 13.
 16: Not suitable for persons under the age of 16.
 18: Not suitable for persons under the age of 18.
 X18: No one under 18 admitted; restricted to licensed adult premises.
 XX: Must not be distributed or exhibited in public.

There are also sub-descriptors used with some of the ratings:

S for sex.
L for language.
V for violence.
P for prejudice.
N for nudity.
H for horror.
D for substance abuse.
SV for sexual violence.

South Korea

The Korea Media Rating Board (영상물등급위원회) in Busan divides licensed films into the following categories:
 All (전체관람가) – Film suitable for all ages.
 12 (12세이상관람가) – Film intended for audiences 12 and over. Underage audiences accompanied by a parent or guardian are allowed.
 15 (15세이상관람가) – Film intended for audiences 15 and over. Underage audiences accompanied by a parent or guardian are allowed.
 18 (청소년관람불가) – No one under 18 is allowed to watch this film.
 Restricted Screening (제한상영가) – Film needs a certain restriction in screening or advertisement as it is considered a highly bad influence to universal human dignity, social value, good customs or national emotion due to excessive expression of nudity, violence, social behavior, etc. (technically not an age restriction but films with this rating may only be screened at "adults only" theatres, with the age of majority set at 19).

Spain

All films to be commercially released in Spain in any medium must be submitted to the ICAA (Instituto de Cinematografía y Artes Audiovisuales - Cinematography and Audiovisual Arts Institute). Classifications are advisory except for X-rated films, which are restricted to specially licensed venues. A supplementary classification, "Especialmente Recomendada para la Infancia" (Especially recommended for children), is sometimes appended to the lowest two classifications. Another supplementary classification, "Especialmente recomendada para el fomento de la igualdad de género" (Especially recommended for the promotion of gender equality), is sometimes appended to any of the classifications except the last one.

 A(i) – General admission.
 7(i) – Not recommended for audiences under 7.
 12 – Not recommended for audiences under 12.
 16 – Not recommended for audiences under 16.
 18 – Not recommended for audiences under 18.
 X – Prohibited for audiences under 18 (may only be shown in premises where adult films are screened).

Sweden

The Swedish Media Council ("Statens medieråd") is a government agency with the aims to reduce the risk of harmful media influences among minors and to empower minors as conscious media users. The classification bestowed on a film should not be viewed as recommendations on the suitability for children, as the law the council operates under (SFS 2010:1882) only mandates them to assess the relative risk to children's well-being. It is not a legal requirement to submit a film to the Media Council. The councils classification only applies to public exhibition, and the law does not require classification of home media.

The following categories are used:

 Btl (Barntillåten) – All ages.
 7 – Children under the age of 7, who are accompanied by an adult, are admitted to films that have been passed for children from the age of 7.
 11 – Children over the age of 7, who are accompanied by an adult, are admitted to films that have been passed for children from the age of 11.
 Not Approved/15 – Children over the age of 11, who are accompanied by an adult, are admitted to films with a 15-year limit.

Switzerland

Switzerland has adopted Germany's Freiwillige Selbstkontrolle der Filmwirtschaft (Voluntary Self-Regulation of the Film Industry, FSK). Under Swiss law, however, children up to two years younger than the age recommendations will be admitted if accompanied by a person invested with parental authority.

Taiwan

From 1994 until 2015, the Government Information Office (GIO) classified films into four categories (General Audience/Protected/Parental Guidance/Restricted) pursuant to its issued Regulations Governing the Classification of Motion Pictures of the Republic of China (電影片分級處理辦法 in traditional Chinese): The "Parental Guidance" rating previously prohibited viewing by children under the age of 12 and required adolescents aged 12–17 to be accompanied by an adult. In 2015, the "Parental Guidance" rating was further divided into two categories: one that prohibits children under the age of 12 and one that prohibits adolescents under the age of 15.

0+: 普遍級(普) (General Audience) – Viewing is permitted for audiences of all ages.
6+: 保護級(護) (Protected) – Viewing is not permitted for children under 6; children between 6 and 11 shall be accompanied and given guidance by parents, teachers, seniors, or adult relatives or friends.
12+: 輔導十二歲級(輔12) (Parental Guidance 12) – Viewing is not permitted for children under 12.
15+: 輔導十五歲級(輔15) (Parental Guidance 15) – Viewing is not permitted for those under 15.
18+: 限制級(限) (Restricted) – Viewing is not permitted for those under 18.

Thailand

A motion picture rating system was proposed in the Film and Video Act of 2007, and was passed on December 20, 2007 by the Thai military-appointed National Legislative Assembly, replacing laws which had been in place since 1930. The draft law was met with resistance from the film industry and independent filmmakers. Activists had hoped for a less-restrictive approach; however, films are still subject to censorship, or can be banned from release altogether if the film is deemed to "undermine or disrupt social order and moral decency, or might impact national security or the pride of the nation".

The ratings were put into effect in August 2009. They are as follows:

 P – Educational.
 G – General audience.
 13 – Suitable for viewers aged 13 years and over.
 15 – Suitable for viewers aged 15 years and over.
 18 – Suitable for viewers aged 18 years and over.
 20 – Content is unsuitable for viewers aged under 20.
 Banned – Films that are not allowed to screen publicly in Thailand.

Turkey

In Turkey, movies to be shown in cinemas are rated by the Evaluation and Classification Board of the Ministry of Culture and Tourism. All films to be made commercially available must be classified, except in the case of educational films which are labeled as "for educational purposes" instead. The board also has the power to refuse classification in extreme cases (producers and distributors can submit an edited version of a movie to the board but edited versions may also be rejected if still deemed inappropriate); in this case, the movie will be banned with the exception of special artistic activities like fairs, festivals, feasts and carnivals.

 Genel İzleyici Kitlesi – General audience.
 6A – Viewers under the age of 6 may watch with accompanying family members.
 6+ – Restricted to viewers aged 6 and over.
 10A – Viewers under the age of 10 may watch with accompanying family members.
 10+ – Restricted to viewers aged 10 and over.
 13A – Viewers under the age of 13 may watch with accompanying family members.
 13+ – Restricted to viewers aged 13 and over.
 16+ – Restricted to viewers aged 16 and over.
 18+ – Restricted to viewers aged 18 and over.

In addition to the age ratings, content is also assessed for violence/horror, sexuality and negative examples i.e. drugs, vulgar and slang language.

Ukraine

The Ukrainian State Film Agency is the central executive body of cinematography in Ukraine. The Ratings issued by the Derzhkino are:

DA: ДА (Дитяча аудиторія): Film aimed for children. They contain no violence or obscenity.
ZA: ЗА (Загальна аудиторія): Suitable for all.
12: Suitable for children aged 12 and older; those under 12 may be admitted if accompanied by an adult as parents may find upsetting to them.
16: Not allowed for viewing by persons under 16 years of age.
18: Not allowed for viewing by persons under 18 years of age. Additionally, "18" rated features may only be screened in theatres after 18:00, and they may be broadcast on television only after 22:00.
Denied: Відмовлено: Refused a classification by the Derzhkino. Content may not be shown, advertised, or distributed anywhere in Ukraine.
Films can be rejected if they promote war, violence, cruelty, and fascism aimed at eliminating Ukraine's independence.

United Arab Emirates

A film and video rating system was introduced in November 2017, and was established commercially as of February 2018 by the National Media Council.

G – For public viewing, suitable for all age groups.
PG – For public viewing, with adult supervision.
PG13 – Persons below 13 allowed with adult supervisions.
PG15 – Persons below 15 allowed with adult supervisions.
15+ – Ages 15 and above only.
18+ – Ages 18 and above only.
21+ – Uncensored films for ages 21 and above only.

United Kingdom

The British Board of Film Classification (BBFC) classifies films to be publicly exhibited in the United Kingdom, although statutory powers remain with local councils which can overrule any of the BBFC's decisions. Since 1984, the BBFC also classifies films made commercially available through a home video format. If the BBFC refuses a classification this effectively amounts to a ban (although local councils retain the legal right to overturn it in the case of cinema exhibition). The BBFC's regulatory powers do not extend to the Internet, so a film they have banned on physical media can still be made available via streaming media/video on demand. Videos designed to inform, educate or instruct or concerned with sport, religion or music are exempt from classification; exempt films may be marked as "E", but this is not an official label.

The current BBFC system is:
 U (Universal – Suitable for all) –  A U-rated film should be suitable for audiences aged four years and over.
 PG (Parental Guidance) – General viewing, but some scenes may be unsuitable for young children. A PG-rated film should not unsettle a child aged around eight or older.
 12A /  12 (Suitable for 12 years and over) – Films classified 12A and video works classified 12 contain material that is not generally suitable for children aged under 12. No one younger than 12 may see a 12A-rated film in a cinema unless accompanied by an adult. No one younger than 12 may rent or buy a 12 rated video work.
 15 (Suitable only for 15 years and older) – No-one under 15 is allowed to see a 15-rated film at the cinema or buy/rent a 15-rated video.
 18 (Suitable only for adults) – No-one under 18 is allowed to see an 18-rated film at the cinema or buy/rent an 18-rated video. 
 R18 (To be shown only in specially licensed cinemas, or supplied only in licensed sex shops, and to adults only) – The R18 category is a special and legally restricted classification primarily for explicit works of consenting sex or strong fetish material involving adults. Films may only be shown to adults in specially licensed cinemas, and video works may be supplied to adults only in licensed sex shops. R18-rated video works may not be supplied by mail order.

Older video works still in circulation may still carry the deprecated Uc label, classifying the work as "Especially suitable for pre-school children".

United States

In the United States, film classification is a voluntary process with the ratings issued by the Motion Picture Association (MPA) via the Classification and Rating Administration (CARA). The system was established in 1968, but the version listed below is the most recent revision, having been in effect since 1990. An unrated film is often informally denoted by "NR" in newspapers and so forth.

 G (General Audiences) – All ages admitted.
 PG (Parental Guidance Suggested) – Some material may not be suitable for children.
 PG-13 (Parents Strongly Cautioned) – Some material may be inappropriate for children under 13.
 R (Restricted) – Under 17 requires accompanying parent or adult guardian.
 NC-17 (Adults Only) – No one 17 and under admitted.

Venezuela

Age ratings are divided into several categories. The age that corresponds to the category and the level of enforcement is defined by municipality ordinances.

In the San Cristóbal municipality the following ratings apply:

 AA – Aimed at children under 12 years of age.
 A – Suitable for all ages.
 B – Suitable for audiences aged 12 years or older.
 C – Suitable for audiences aged 16 years or older.
 D – Suitable for audiences aged 18 years or older.

In the Baruta municipality the following ratings apply:

 A – Suitable for all ages.
 B – Suitable for audiences aged 12 years or older.
 C – Suitable for audiences aged 16 years or older.
 D – Suitable for adults.

In the Maracaibo municipality children under the age of two are not admitted to performances and the ratings are enforced:

 A – Suitable for all ages.
 B – Suitable for audiences aged 14 years or older.
 C – Suitable for audiences aged 18 years or older.

Vietnam

All theatrical releases are screened by the Cinema Department of the Ministry of Culture, Sport and Travel of Vietnam to ensure suitability for public viewing. Regardless of the rating, some scenes may be altered or removed to comply with regulations. The classification was revised in January 2017, replacing the previous rating system.

 P (meaning Universal) – Suitable for all ages.
 C13 – Persons under age 13 are not admitted.
 C16 – Persons under age 16 are not admitted.
 C18 – Persons under age 18 are not admitted.

Unlike the previous rating system, the current rating system does not have parental guidance and ratings other than P are considered to be restricted.

See also

 Television content rating system
 Video game content rating system

Notes

References

External links
 IMDb's information about rating systems from all over the world.
 FilmClassifications.com Information regarding film classifications from Australia, Canada, Ireland, New Zealand, Singapore, South Africa, the United Kingdom and the United States.
 Australia Australian Classification Board.
 Denmark Medierådet for Børn og Unge (The Media Council for Children and Young People).
 Finland Finnish Centre for Media Education and Audiovisual Media.
 France Centre National de la Cinématographie (CNC).
 Germany Spitzenorganisation der Filmwirtschaft e. V. (SPIO)
 Iceland Félag rétthafa í sjónvarps- og kvikmyndaiðnaði.
 India Central Board of Film Certification.
 Irish Film Censor's Office.
 Italy Board of Film Classification.
 Japan Administration Commission of Motion Picture Code of Ethics.
 South Korea Korea Media Rating Board.
 Malaysia Lembaga Penapisan Filem Malaysia (Malaysia Film Filter Board)
 Netherlands Kijkwijzer (and Nicam).
 New Zealand Office of Film & Literature Classification.
 Norway Media Authority.
 Philippines  Movie and Television Review and Classification Board
 Singapore Media Development Authority.
 Sweden Statens medieråd.
 South African Film and Publications Board.
 Spanish Film Academy (ACE).
 United Kingdom British Board of Film Classification (BBFC).
 USA Motion Picture Association (MPA).